The Córas Iompair Éireann 201 Class was a class of 34 diesel electric locomotives manufactured by Metropolitan-Vickers at their Dukinfield Works in Manchester. They were a smaller, lighter and less powerful version of the 001 Class and were originally intended for branch line passenger and freight (mixed traffic) duties. They were introduced in 1956 and, although their duties changed over the years, were in regular service on the Irish railway network until the mid-1980s.  Six were sold to Northern Ireland Railways (NIR) in 1986.

Service history

Unfortunately, these locomotives suffered from two distinct problems: 
 During the late 1950s and early 1960s, following the publication of the Andrews Report (mimicking the widescale the Beeching Axe in Britain), CIÉ undertook large-scale closures of branch lines, leaving the engines without a purpose.
The locomotives were of insufficient power for their duties and their Crossley engines suffered reliability problems.  The existing Metro-Vick traction motors and generators were recognised as robust and retained in the rebuild. 

Replacement engines:
Because of the problems with the Crossley engines attempts were made to fit the locomotives with more suitable equipment. From 1969, however, a permanent solution was found by fitting the entire class with General Motors engines, a similar process that was previously undergone by the 001 Class). 
 
 New Duties:
From 1969 the class were given new duties, being partnered with former 2600 class diesel multiple units converted to four-car push-pull carriage rakes to operate the suburban services around Dublin. In 1984 the Dublin suburban lines over which they worked were electrified and new electric multiple units operated the renamed Dublin Area Rapid Transit (DART) system.

The first member of the class to be withdrawn was No. B201, being bomb damaged in 1973.  The remaining members of the class, except for the six sold to NIR, were withdrawn over the two years following the opening of the DART system having completed 30 years service for their operators.

Numbering
When built, these locomotives were numbered C201-C234, and as locomotives were re-engined, they were renumbered B201-B234 to reflect their increased power. However, the prefix letter was later dropped.

Livery 
Over the years the class has carried six different liveries. When introduced they were painted an all-over silver livery which unfortunately dirtied quickly and was not a good advert for dieselisation. This was followed by all-over CIE green livery with a thin lighter green band on the lower panels, giving a uniform appearance to the train sets. In the next change black became the base colour with just a white relief around the top panel, which opened to a squared-off 'V' between the cab windows. Some locomotives received large yellow panel to the cab fronts to aid visibility. With the adaptation by CIE of its "Black and Tan" scheme in the mid-1960s, the locomotives received this livery with a white line at roof level to match the coaches. The last CIE livery was of Golden Brown with a very broad black band covering the upper panels at the level of, and as wide as, the cab windows.
Those locomotives sold to NIR carried their blue livery.

NIR use

After withdrawal from CIÉ, six locomotives were sold to Northern Ireland Railways, which designated them 104 Class. They entered traffic for NIR in 1986–1987, except 105. Originally, CIÉ 224 was intended to become 105, but it was subsequently rejected by NIR and replaced by 218, which only entered traffic in 1991. 224 was left stored with NIR until it was scrapped in January 1996.

Of those that entered service, some had very short lives working for their new owners. They were stored as soon as any problems arose (e.g. a seized engine or traction motor), and the whole class was formally withdrawn in 1993 (107/109) or 1995 (the others). The locomotives involved, their new numbers and their withdrawal are set out below:

Accidents and incidents
Two people were killed and 29 were injured.

Preservation

 Two 201 Class locomotives, numbers 226 and 231, have been preserved by the Irish Traction Group 226 was the first mainline diesel to be preserved in Ireland. C231 is currently based at the Downpatrick and County Down Railway, painted in CIÉ Green livery, whilst 226 is undergoing restoration at Carrick-on-Suir. Irish Traction Group
 A third example, NIR 106/CIÉ 227 was preserved privately and displayed at Cahirciveen, County Kerry  The Irish Crossleys and carries the number C202, which was supposedly the number of the locomotive hauling the last train from Cahirciveen in 1960 but it was in fact both 227 and 201 which worked the last up and down trains.  Irish Rail recovered the engine for reuse in its 141/181 class locomotives.  This locomotive and its three remaining siblings were stored in an unprotected site on NIR. Metal theft at this stage rendered it and its sisters a write-off as far as ever running again was concerned.  Whilst scrapping of its sisters was taking place this locomotive was further stripped of almost all internal equipment (compressor, exhauster, air tanks, cooler fan, etc)  before being moved to Cahirsiveen in 1997. The locomotive was cosmetically restored and repainted in silver and renumbered C202. The almost empty engine room was floored with plywood. While in Cahirsiveen the body suffered extensive corrosion from 7 years of open air display near the sea and its windows were smashed again. An arson attack on the locomotive as well as its "eye sore" appearance on the landscape meant that scrapping was becoming very likely. In around 2004, the locomotive was saved from scrapping by a member of the now defunct "A15r [sic] Group and moved from Caherciveen to a site used by a heritage railway at Bilberry, Waterford with the intention of being restored as part of a scheme to reopen the New Ross railway.  However, during her time in Bilberry the locomotive was further vandalised. The plywood floor was ripped up and any remaining traction motor cable was cut out by metal thieves. The locomotive also suffered further deterioration due to being stored in the open with rainwater entering through broken windows and rotten roof panels. In 2010, the locomotive was relocated to a more secure site near Kilmacow village, and traveled the 10 km journey to this premises in Kilmacow by road on a low loader.  It is believed that the wish of the current owners is still that 227 will be restored at least cosmetically, but this seems unlikely. As of July 2016, the locomotive remained in its derelict state at the Kilmacow site along with several other Bord na Mona locomotives and a Wickham inspection car."

Models
 The C Class is available as a brass and white metal 00 gauge kit from No Nonsense Kits, now acquired by Phoenix Paints.
 A resin version is available from Silver Fox Models.
 A Rapid Prototyped N Scale body is available from Valve Design.

Notes and references

Notes

References

Sources

External links

 Eiretrains - Irish Locomotives
 Irish Traction Group webpage for preserved 201 Class No.226
 Irish Traction Group webpage for preserved 201 Class No.231

Bo-Bo locomotives
Iarnród Éireann locomotives
Metropolitan-Vickers locomotives
Diesel-electric locomotives of Northern Ireland
Diesel-electric locomotives of Ireland
5 ft 3 in gauge locomotives
Railway locomotives introduced in 1956